A synthesizer or synthesiser is a collection of electronic devices that modify or manipulate an electronically generated musical tone or sound source.

Synthesizer or synthesiser may also refer to:
Frequency synthesizer, an electronic system for generating any of a range of frequencies from a single fixed timebase or oscillator 
Video synthesizer, a device that electronically creates a video signal
Speech synthesizer, an electronic device or computer program that produces human-like speech
Synthesizer, a 2007 album by Information Society
"Synthesizer", a 1998 song by Outkast from Aquemini
"Synthesizer", a 2003 song by Electric Six from Fire
"Synthesizer", a 2010 song by Mike Posner from 31 Minutes to Takeoff

See also
Synthesis (disambiguation)
Synthesizer Patel, a character in Look Around You played by Sanjeev Kohli